Pravin Guanasagaran (born 12 January 1993) is a Singaporean footballer who plays as a midfielder for Football West State League Division 1 club Canning City SC.

Youth career 
Pravin joined the National Football Academy U18 in 2011 before moving to Canning City SC.

References 

1993 births
Living people
Singaporean footballers
Association football midfielders
Singaporean people of Tamil descent
Singaporean sportspeople of Indian descent
Young Lions FC players